Jacques Louis Gustave Van Offelen (Isleworth, 18 October 1916 – Uccle, 22 February 2006) was a Belgian liberal politician, burgomaster and minister for the PVV.  He graduated from the Institut Supérieur de Commerce de l'Etat (1938) in Antwerp, and in 1939 became a licentiate in economy at the Universite Libre de Bruxelles. He obtained a PhD from the University of Liège in 1943 and became a civil servant and docent.

He was burgomaster of Uccle (1964–), a member of parliament (1958–1977) and senator (1977–1978) for the PVV in the district Brussels. Van Offelen was Minister of Foreign Trade (1958–1961) and Minister for Economic Affairs (1966–1968) in the Belgian government.

Sources

 Jacques Van Offelen (liberal archive) (PDF, Dutch)
 Jacques Van Offelen (MR, French)

1916 births
2006 deaths
Flemish activists
Free University of Brussels (1834–1969) alumni
Mayors of places in Belgium